Jimmy Bradley (21 March 1927 – 26 November 2008) was a Scottish footballer, who played for Hibernian, Third Lanark, Shrewsbury Town, Headington United, Gravesend & Northfleet and Dumbarton. Bradley made only first team appearance for Hibernian, which was in the 1950 Scottish League Cup Final defeat by Motherwell.

References

External links
 

1927 births
2008 deaths
Footballers from Greenock
Association football wingers
Scottish footballers
Scottish Football League players
Hibernian F.C. players
Third Lanark A.C. players
Shrewsbury Town F.C. players
Oxford United F.C. players
Ebbsfleet United F.C. players
Dumbarton F.C. players
English Football League players